Vaidya Suresh Chaturvedi (1928-2017) was an Ayurveda practitioner from Rajasthan, India. Previously he was a professor at Bombay University and has written many books on Ayurveda. In 2000, he was awarded the Padma Shri, the fourth highest civilian award in the India. As an active practitioner of the ancient science of Ayurveda (healing), he is known in the national and international arenas of alternate medicines and has presented numerous papers. He has held a number of conferences in India. He was, a Ph.D guide in the University of Mumbai.

 His role in demystifying the Neem's extraordinary ability to heal has been crucial in bringing acceptability to the Neem tree in the global context.

Early life
Born in a bramhin family to shri Gendalal who was a police inspector in Bharatpur State police. Suresh was his fourth son. He completed his early education till fifth grade from sanatan dharma school. He came to Mumbai in 1938 where he was enrolled in a Sanskrit school in Gulalwadi . After completing his matriculation he enrolled into gokuldas Tejpal Sanskrit College and at the tender age of 14 witnessed the slogans of quit India from gwaliya tank grand. He was married at the age of 25 to Sudha.

Education
After he discovered his interest in medicinal studies He started studying Ayurveda in 1943 at state Ayurvedic college Jaipur but due to various circumstances he could not complete it and in 1944 he took admission sanatan dharma ayurvedic college Lahore (Re established as S.D college in ambala in 1948 after partition) His studies again received a halt as he had to leave Lahore in 1947 due to the riots leaving midway his course after appearing for the third year exam. He was later awarded the degree "vaidya kaviraj" on this academic completion after which he took admission in Ashtanga ayurvedic college Calcutta. After completing his education he took training as shishya under vaidya nandkishor Sharma and later  vaidya ramgopal Sharma and later on he started his own medical practice in Vile-Parle (east), Mumbai, India at B.L. Ruia High School Premises.

Awards and recognition
Padmashree on the occasion of Golden Jubilee' of Indian Republic.
Pt Ramnarayan Sharma Award (2008)
Ayurveda Award
Shri Vasant Naik Pratishthan Samman
Bhishakshri(2014)
Charak Sanmann by Red Swastik society (2015) 
Honorary Physician: Governor of Maharashtra
Chikatsak Guru: Rashtriya Ayurveda Vidyaeeth, New Delhi 
Consulting Physician: Bombay Hospital (Mumbai) 
Honorary Director Sri Sri Ravi Shankar Ayurvedic College
Managing Trustee: Arogya Sansthan Trust
Patron Member: All India Ayurvedic congress
1996 Bharat Nirman award by Hon. Shri Karunakaran - Member of Parliament, Govt. of India.
1995 International Congress of Alternative Medicine award by Hon. Shri S.N. Reddy - Governor of Orissa.
1994 Bharat Nirman award by Hon. Smt. Najama Heptullah - Deputy Speaker (Rajya Sabha), Govt. of India.
1993 Bharat Nirman Pracharya award by Hon. Shri Siddheshwar Prasad - Governor of Tripura.

Bibliography
Over the years Dr. Chaturvedi has written thirty one books on Ayurveda in Hindi, English, Gujrati and Marathi, Former Prime Minister of India, Shri Morarji Desai, released one of his books titled "Geeta Main Arogya" whereas the English version "Geeta and Health" is fore worded by Dr. Karan Singh - former Indian Union Minister of Health. In addition he has published various scientific research papers on various diseases like Diabetes, Obesity, Cancer, Heart disease, Leucoderma, and AIDS.

Books

Arogya Path
Ahaar Chikitsa
Ayurved Ke Rahsya
Ayurved For You
Arogya Suman
Bal Swastha
Cancer
Chronic Diseases
Dampatya Jeevan ke Sopaan
Diet & Health Through Ayurved
Fit for Health	
Gharelu Ayurvedic Ilaaj
Gharelu Dawaiyaan
Geeta and Health
Geeta Mein Arogya
Health Care
Maharog Chikitsa
Naari Jeevan ki chintayein
Kaya Kalp
Rog Vigyan
Saral Ayurvedic Chikitsa
Sau Varsh Kaise Jiyen
Saundarya Aur Swasthya
Striyon ka Swasthya aur Rog
Subodh Ayurved Chikitsa
Neem in Ayurved
Neem aur Swasthya
Ghargathu Davao(Gujrati)	
Beauty & Health
Health Care
Kadu Nimba (Marathi)
Tips for health care

Research Papers

Role of Neem in Health and Environment.
Role of Ayurveda in cancers.

Previous Positions

Director Of Emami Limited
Advisor of Lupin Limited
 Vice President of Dhanvantari Medical foundation 
Principal of KGMP Ayurvedic college
Chairman National Consultative Committee- Neem Foundation
Ph.D Guide and faculty member in Mumbai University
Senate member of Rajiv Gandhi University of Health science, Karnataka
Member of Governing council and finance committee of rashtriya Ayurveda New Delhi and National Institute of Ayurved Jaipur

References

External links
http://www.drchaturvedi.com/

Recipients of the Padma Shri in medicine
Ayurvedacharyas
2017 deaths
1928 births
People from Bharatpur district